Alexis Somarriba (born 11 May 1994) is a Nicaraguan footballer who plays for Managua F.C.

References

1994 births
Living people
Nicaraguan men's footballers
Nicaragua international footballers
Managua F.C. players
Real Estelí F.C. players
Association football forwards